= Select Milano =

Italian think tank

Select Milano (SM) is a think-tank that was established in 2013 to examine potential connections between the City of London and financial institutions in Milan in the context of Brexit. Bepi Pezzulli has served as the chairperson since 2016.
